Ernest Leon "Ernie" Pough (born May 17, 1952) is a former American football player who performed in three seasons in the National Football League (NFL) for the Pittsburgh Steelers and New York Giants.

Early life
Pough grew up in Jacksonville, Florida and attended college at Texas Southern University in Houston, Texas, a historically black college which at the time competed in Division II. He was a four-time All-America track athlete as well as a running back and wide receiver on the school's football team.

Football career
Pough was drafted by the Pittsburgh Steelers in the third round of the 1976 NFL Draft. Although he was considered undersized for the NFL, his sprinter's speed (he ran the 100 metres in 9.3 seconds) made him a threat.

He played for the Steelers for two seasons before being traded along with guard Jim Clack to the New York Giants prior to the 1978 season in exchange for offensive lineman John Hicks. He played one season with the Giants and one for the Edmonton Eskimos of the Canadian Football League before ending his football career.

References

1952 births
Living people
Stanton College Preparatory School alumni
American football wide receivers
Texas Southern Tigers football players
Pittsburgh Steelers players
New York Giants players
Edmonton Elks players
Players of American football from Jacksonville, Florida